This is a videography and filmography of the South Korean boy group NCT.

List of music videos

Other videos

Video albums

Live video albums

Other video albums

Filmography

Film

Television

References 

Videography
Videographies of South Korean artists